is a railway station on the Kagoshima Main Line in Yahatahigashi-ku, Kitakyushu, Fukuoka Prefecture, Japan operated by Kyushu Railway Company (JR Kyushu). Opened in 1997, the station serves the nearby Space World theme park which opened in 1990.

Lines
Space World Station is served by the Kagoshima Main Line.

Station layout

The station consists of two island platforms serving four tracks.

Platforms

Adjacent stations

History
The station opened on 2 July 1999.

Future developments
The nearby Space World theme park is due to close in December 2017, but JR Kyushu has no plans to rename the station following the closure. From the start of the revised timetable on 17 March 2018, rapid services will no longer stop at this station.

Passenger statistics
In fiscal 2016, the station was used by an average of 2,878 passengers daily (boarding passengers only), making it the 64th busiest JR Kyushu station.

Surrounding area

  National Route 3
 Space World theme park
 Kitakyushu Museum of Natural History & Human History
 Kitakyushu Environment Museum
 Kitakyushu Innovation Gallery and Studio
 Aeon Mall Yahata Higashi shopping mall
 Steel Memorial Yawata Hospital
 Kitakyushu Chuo Junior High School

See also
 List of railway stations in Japan

References

External links

  

Railway stations in Fukuoka Prefecture
Stations of Kyushu Railway Company
Railway stations in Japan opened in 1999